Joseph D. McKenna is a member of the Massachusetts House of Representatives, sworn in January 2015. A resident of Webster, Massachusetts, he was elected as a Republican to represent the 18th Worcester district. McKenna is a former clinical counselor and legislative aide.

Committee memberships
 Joint Committee on Consumer Protection and Professional Licensure
 Joint Committee on Labor and Workforce Development

See also
 2019–2020 Massachusetts legislature
 2021–2022 Massachusetts legislature

References

Republican Party members of the Massachusetts House of Representatives
People from Webster, Massachusetts
Living people
21st-century American politicians
Year of birth missing (living people)